Jean Darricau, (born 2 October 1931) is a French former rugby union and league footballer in the 1940s, 1950s and 1960s. He played as centre or lock forward. 

After his debut in rugby union for US Dax with which he won the Frantz Reichel Cup in 1949 and 1950,then a stint at SBUC, he switched codes in 1952 to join rugby league and Bordeaux, with which he won the French Championship in 1954. Later, he joined the Lyon club.  

Thanks to his performances, he was called up twice for the France national team in 1957 to face Great Britain, and was called up for the 1960 tour.

Biography 
Outside the pitch, he worked as an industrial designer.

Honours

Rugby league 
 Team honours :
 French champion in : 1954 (Bordeaux).

Rugby union 
 Team honours :
 French junior champion : 1949 and 1950 (Dax).

References

Bibliography

External link
Jean Darricau at rugbyleagueproject.org
 
Stade Bordelais players
US Dax players
French rugby league players
France national rugby league team players
Living people
1931 births
Rugby league centres
Rugby league locks
Sportspeople from Pyrénées-Atlantiques